Kee High School is a rural, public high school located in Lansing, Iowa. The school is part of the Eastern Allamakee Community School District.  Their mascot is the Kee-Hawk.

Athletics
The Kee-Hawks compete in the Upper Iowa Conference in the following sports:

Cross Country
 Boys' 5-time State Champions (1980, 1981, 1982, 1988, 1989)
Volleyball
Football
Basketball
Track and Field
Girls' State co-champions (2019) with Alburnett

Baseball 
 11-time State Champions (1973, 1977, 1978, 1980, 1981, 1986, 1989, 1990, 1991, 1992, 2005) 
Softball
 2016, 2017 Class 1A State Champions

As of 2006, Kee's baseball coach, Gene Schultz, is the winningest high school baseball coach in the United States.

See also
List of high schools in Iowa

References

External links
Official Website

Public high schools in Iowa
Schools in Allamakee County, Iowa
1961 establishments in Iowa